Deltophora diversella is a moth of the family Gelechiidae. It is found in South Africa, southern Mozambique, Kenya and Uganda.

The length of the forewings is 5–6.5 mm. The forewings are grey-brown to ochreous, with dark brown markings. Adults have been recorded on wing in January, May, September and October.

References

Moths described in 1979
Deltophora
Moths of Africa